Supriya Shukla (née Raina) is an Indian television and film actress. She is known for her role as Sarla Arora in Zee TV's popular dramas Kundali Bhagya and Kumkum Bhagya.

Filmography

Television

Films

References

External links
 

Living people
Indian television actresses
Indian soap opera actresses
Place of birth missing (living people)
Actors from Mumbai
1975 births